James Lowe (26 November 1863 – 17 July 1922) was a Scottish footballer who played as a forward, adept at playing on the left wing or in the centre.

Career
Lowe played club football for St Bernard's, was a regular in the Edinburgh representative team throughout the 1880s (19 matches in total against the likes of Glasgow, Lanarkshire, London, Renfrewshire and Sheffield) and made one appearance for Scotland in 1887.

References

1863 births
1922 deaths
Footballers from Edinburgh
Scottish footballers
Scotland international footballers
St Bernard's F.C. players
Association football forwards